The men's  100 metre freestyle event at the 1975 World Aquatics Championships took place 27 July.

Results

Heats

Final

References
FINA Official

Swimming at the 1975 World Aquatics Championships